W.A.K.O. World Championships 2013 in Antalya were held at the Maritim Pine resort in Antalya, Turkey from Monday, November 30 to Sunday, December 8, 2013.

Overall Medals Standing (Top 5)

References 

WAKO Amateur World Championships events
2013 in kickboxing